Befriended is the sixth full-length studio album by American alternative rock band the Innocence Mission. The album was released on 25 August 2003 in the United Kingdom and Ireland by Agenda and on 2 September 2003 in the United States and Canada by Badman Recording Co.

The lyrics of the song "No Storms Come" are adapted from the poem "Heaven-Haven: A Nun Takes the Veil" by Gerard Manley Hopkins.

Track listing

Bonus Tracks

References 

Befriended
The Innocence Mission albums
Badman Recording Co. albums